Abacetus hirmocoeloides is a species of ground beetle in the subfamily Pterostichinae. It was described by Straneo in 1949.

References

hirmocoeloides
Beetles described in 1949